Martin Hansen Thau (28 July 1887 – 8 May 1979) was a Danish gymnast who competed in the 1912 Summer Olympics. He was part of the Danish team, which won the silver medal in the gymnastics men's team, Swedish system event.

References

External links
 profile
 

1887 births
1979 deaths
Danish male artistic gymnasts
Gymnasts at the 1912 Summer Olympics
Olympic gymnasts of Denmark
Olympic silver medalists for Denmark
Olympic medalists in gymnastics
Medalists at the 1912 Summer Olympics